Teucrium pilbaranum is a species of flowering plant in the family Lamiaceae, and is endemic to the Pilbara region of Western Australia. It is an upright subshrub with three-part or deeply-lobed leaves and white flowers.

Description
The flowers are arranged in groups of between four and eight near the ends of the stems, each flower in a leaf axil. Flowering has been observed in May and September.

Taxonomy
Teucrium pilbaranum was first formally described in 1999 by Barry Conn in the journal Telopea from specimens collected by Andrew Mitchell near Mulga Downs homestead in 1995. The specific epithet (pilbaranum) refers to the occurrence of this species in the Pilbara region.

Distribution and habitat
This germander grows in the floodplain of the Fortescue River in the Pilbara biogeographic region of Western Australia.

Conservation status
Teucrium pilbaranum is listed as "Priority Two" by the Western Australian Government Department of Parks and Wildlife meaning that it is poorly known and from only one or a few locations.

References

pilbaranum
Lamiales of Australia
Eudicots of Western Australia
Plants described in 1999
Taxa named by Barry John Conn